The Orchestra may refer to:

 The Orchestra (band), a rock band formed by former members of the Electric Light Orchestra and ELO Part II
 The Orchestra (app), an iPad app
 The Orchestra (film), a 1990 animated film by Zbigniew Rybczyński, 1990 Prix Italia winner in category Prix Italia for Arts

See also
 The Orckestra, an English avant-garde jazz and avant-rock ensemble
 Orchestra (disambiguation)